WNNE (channel 31), branded on air as The Valley CW, is a television station licensed to Montpelier, Vermont, United States, serving the Burlington, Vermont–Plattsburgh, New York market as an affiliate of The CW Plus. It is owned by Hearst Television alongside Plattsburgh-licensed NBC affiliate WPTZ (channel 5). WNNE and WPTZ share studios on Community Drive in South Burlington, Vermont, with a secondary studio and news bureau on Cornelia Street in Plattsburgh; through a channel sharing agreement, the two stations transmit using WPTZ's spectrum from an antenna on Vermont's highest peak, Mount Mansfield.

Overview
Originally licensed to Hartford, Vermont, and established as a separate station in its own right, WNNE previously served as a semi-satellite of WPTZ, serving the Upper Connecticut River Valley of east-central Vermont and west-central New Hampshire. WNNE broadcast the same program schedule as its parent station, but aired some limited advertising specific to the Upper Valley that was added to WPTZ's programming. Master control and most internal operations were based at the WPTZ studios in Plattsburgh.

WNNE primarily served the southern and eastern portions of the Plattsburgh–Burlington market including Sullivan and Grafton counties in west-central New Hampshire. Additional viewership came from surrounding counties in the southern New Hampshire sub-market which is actually part of the Greater Boston designated market area. As a result, WNNE was within reach of the home territories of sister stations WMUR-TV in Manchester, New Hampshire, and WMTW in Portland, Maine, as well as Hearst's New England flagship, WCVB-TV in Boston.

History
The analog channel 31 allocation in the Upper Valley was first occupied by WRLH in West Lebanon, New Hampshire, an NBC affiliate which operated from 1966 to 1968 and from 1971 to 1974. (The WRLH call letters are currently used by a Fox affiliate in Richmond, Virginia, owned by the Sinclair Broadcast Group.)

The Taft Broadcasting Corporation, the same company who founded KGUL-TV in Galveston, Texas (now KHOU in Houston), but unrelated to the larger Taft Broadcasting Company of Cincinnati, obtained a permit for a new channel 31 that was by then reallocated to Hartford in 1977. Initially, this new television station was assigned the call letters WMVW but went on-the-air September 27, 1978, as WNNE-TV from its facility in White River Junction. The station was granted a waiver by the Federal Communications Commission (FCC) to identify as "Hartford/Hanover" in 1980 and the -TV suffix was subsequently dropped at a later time.

For its first twelve years, WNNE was a full-fledged station running its own syndicated lineup as well as network programming from NBC. On December 17, 1990, Heritage Media (then-owner of WPTZ) bought WNNE and turned it into a semi-satellite of WPTZ. For a time, most programming still originated out of WNNE, but certain shows were relayed from Plattsburgh through a new microwave relay system. In 2000, WPTZ moved WNNE's master control to its studios in Plattsburgh. This move would be followed by WNNE's website being integrated into a separate section of WPTZ's website in July 2001. On some cable systems in Central Vermont (such as Charter Communications systems serving Barre, St. Johnsbury and Chelsea; and Comcast in Rutland), both WPTZ and WNNE were carried even though the two stations' schedules were identical.

On July 20, 2005, WNNE began broadcasting a standard definition digital signal on UHF channel 25 from a transmitter on WVTA's nearby tower on Mount Ascutney. WNNE did not carry any of the additional digital subchannels that have been carried by WPTZ, including NBC Weather Plus (despite this, weather graphics seen on the stations' newscasts carried the "NewsChannel 5 & 31 Weather Plus" branding), This TV, MeTV, or The CW, though Comcast does carry WPTZ's subchannels in the Upper Valley.

During the analog era and some of the digital-only broadcasting period, WNNE operated a repeater, W65AM, on channel 65 in Lebanon. W65AM had a transmitter west of Lebanon on Crafts Hill. W65AM had its license cancelled by the FCC on March 19, 2010. This translator was within reach of a former analog repeater operated by Portland sister station WMTW, W27CP (channel 27) in White River Junction, which was established in 2005 after WMTW moved its main transmitter from Mount Washington closer to the Greater Portland area in Maine. That signal had a transmitter located in Lebanon's Mascoma section. FCC regulations do not allow two or more stations from two or more different markets have coverage in the same location (in this case, White River Junction); this rule does not apply to repeaters, so WMTW's translator was allowed to operate. Hearst sold W27CP to New Hampshire Public Television in 2009 after taking it silent following the loss of its lease of the transmitter site.

On August 2, 2016, WNNE quietly dropped its "Channel 31" branding and logo; the station then used WPTZ's "NBC 5" branding and logo with no separate branding, and was only mentioned during WPTZ's legal IDs. However, it still aired separate commercials.

Spectrum sale and channel sharing agreement
In the FCC's incentive auction, WNNE sold its spectrum for $50,464,592 and announced that it would enter into a post-auction channel sharing agreement. WNNE now channel-shares with sister station WPTZ; as the latter station's signal does not sufficiently reach Hartford, WNNE changed its city of license to Montpelier, Vermont. The station shut down operations on its pre-auction channel and commenced channel-sharing operations, effective July 22, 2018; on July 20, Hearst Television announced that WNNE would become the market's CW affiliate following the move. This was done by re-numbering that station's former WPTZ subchannel on 5.2 to WNNE's 31.1 virtual channel via PSIP. This resolves the concerns raised years before regarding a lack of access to the WPTZ sub-channels for WNNE viewers, yet it also limits viewers in the Upper Valley to cable and satellite viewing options for NBC programming.

In August 2019, Hearst Television upgraded WNNE to the 1080i full HD picture format; prior to this upgrade, programming on this station was being presented in 720p.

2019 antenna fire
On November 19, 2019, WNNE, WPTZ and CBS affiliate WCAX-TV (channel 3) were knocked off the air by a fire of their combined antenna at their transmitter facility. The cause of the fire was unknown. The outage affected over-the-air and satellite viewers; cable subscribers continued to receive the three stations via direct fiber feeds.

News operation

Throughout the 1980s and 1990s, WNNE operated a fairly large news department for a station of its size. The original anchor team consisted of Mike Harding with news, John Yacavone providing weather, and sports from Rick Karle. On-air personnel routinely performed multiple tasks often shooting, editing, and producing their entire stories for air. During the week, the station offered local news and weather updates from 7 until 9a.m. at :25 and :55 past the hour during Today on weekday mornings in lieu of a traditional broadcast.

Full newscasts aired weekdays at noon (for thirty minutes) as well as weeknights at 6 and 11p.m. In addition, there were also prime time weather forecast cut-ins provided during network programming. However, it did not produce any weekend news shows. All newscasts aired out of WNNE's studios in the basement of the Pines Motel that later became a Regency Inn & Suites property.

In the mid-1980s, NBC wanted satellite truck coverage in the Northeastern United States, particularly New England. Due to WNNE's central location, it was considered a perfect fit and a new satellite vehicle partially funded by the network was stationed at the outlet's White River Junction studios. The station also maintained its own satellite truck that assisted in local news gathering efforts in the Upper Valley and the surrounding areas. In the mid-1990s, both satellite trucks including the network-owned vehicle were acquired by WPTZ. The latter actually remained in service with a WPTZ logo until 2003.

After being acquired by Heritage Media in 1990, WNNE's local operations were significantly cut back. This eventually culminated in the cancellation of the station's newscasts in June 2001. By then, it had eliminated the weekday morning and weekday noon newscasts with the station simulcasting only the 6 a.m. hour of WPTZ's morning show and Today cut-ins. WNNE's noon show would be replaced with an infomercial.   After dropping full separate local broadcasts on weeknights, the station began inserting updates originating from its White River Junction studios during the WPTZ newscast simulcasts. There were also separate Upper Valley-specific weather forecasts provided. To further establish a link between WNNE and WPTZ, the microwave link between the two was upgraded in order to allow live news coverage from WNNE to air on WPTZ. This move also allowed WPTZ's reports from Montpelier and New York State to be seen on WNNE.

In 2007, the weeknight news updates were dropped as well. Since then, WNNE has functioned as WPTZ's "Upper Valley Newsroom" and is referred to as such during all newscasts. After this change, there was only a separate title opening that remained indicating WNNE was ever a separate station. Eventually, the news opening was dropped as well. Previously during all local news programming, the station superimposed its channel 31 logo over the channel 5 logo in the right hand corner of the screen. On occasion when WNNE has technical problems, WPTZ's logo peeked through. Contributions by WNNE to WPTZ's newscasts included video footage and a live headline (weeknights at 5:30) from its White River Junction studios (which was staffed with a full-time multimedia journalist). In addition to the Upper Valley and another Vermont bureau in Colchester covering Burlington, WPTZ also airs national news from a Washington, D.C. bureau that is operated by Hearst. It employs several reporters who give live reports to the various company-owned affiliates.

Despite including "HD" in its logo, all newscasts were aired in pillarboxed 4:3 standard definition until April 26, 2011 when WPTZ finally upgraded to 16:9 enhanced definition widescreen. Although not truly high definition, broadcasts match the aspect ratio of HD television screens. That station was one of six remaining outlets owned by Hearst that had yet to make the upgrade to local news in enhanced definition or full HD-level. For a period of time thereafter, the simulcasts on WNNE remained in pillarboxed 4:3 due to lack of a high definition-capable master control for WNNE at WPTZ's studios in Plattsburgh. This has since been upgraded as well.

On August 2, 2016, following the change to "NBC 5", the newscasts were retitled to NBC 5 News; in addition, the station no longer superimposed the channel 31 logo and it began using the "NBC 5" logo during all of its local news programming. Upon the channel share and transfer of the CW+ affiliation from WPTZ-DT2, WNNE now carries WPTZ's 10 p.m. prime time newscast, a half-hour program simulcast on WPTZ's MeTV subchannel.

In August 2018, WPTZ's Upper Valley bureau moved from White River Junction to a new space on Mechanic Street in Lebanon, New Hampshire. In July 2019, WPTZ's Vermont facilities moved from Colchester to a new facility in South Burlington; production of the station's newscasts were concurrently relocated to the new facility from the Plattsburgh studio, which remains as a secondary facility.

Notable former on-air staff
Tom Caron – sports anchor (now at NESN)
Brett Haber – sports anchor (formerly at WUSA)

Technical information

Subchannel

Analog-to-digital conversion
WNNE discontinued regular programming on its analog signal, over UHF channel 31, on February 17, 2009, the original target date in which full-power television stations in the United States were to transition from analog to digital broadcasts under federal mandate (which was later pushed back to June 12, 2009). The station's digital signal remained on its pre-transition UHF channel 25. Through the use of PSIP, digital television receivers display the station's virtual channel as its former UHF analog channel 31.

References

External links
Official website

Television channels and stations established in 1978
1978 establishments in Vermont
NNE
Hearst Television
Montpelier, Vermont